Streets of Your Town is an Australian two-part factual television documentary that looks at Australian suburbs. The series began on the ABC on 15 November 2016. Tim Ross is a comedian, broadcaster and architecture enthusiast who acts as a tour guide, exploring how and why Australian suburbs look the way they do. Interviewees include Peter McIntyre, Kevin McCloud and Alain de Botton. The series was repeated in May 2017.

References

External links
 Official website 
Tim Ross - Man About The House 

Australian Broadcasting Corporation original programming
Australian factual television series
2016 Australian television series debuts
English-language television shows